Anton Friedrich Hohl (17 November 1789–23 January 1862) was a German professor of obstetrics born in Lobenstein.

He studied law at the University of Leipzig, and following graduation opened a law practice in his home town of Lobenstein. In 1824 he was able procure sufficient funds to study medicine. In 1827 he obtained his medical doctorate at Halle an der Saale with a dissertation on microcephaly. 
This thesis was based on a specimen from the teratological collection of Johann Friedrich Meckel (1781-1833). In 1834 Hohl became a full professor of obstetrics at Halle.

Hohl published numerous works in the field of obstetrics, including an influential textbook titled . (Textbook of Obstetrics with the Inclusion of Obstetric Operations and Forensic Obstetrics). In 1852 he was the first physician to describe agenesis of the lower spine. Earlier in his career he provided a description for design of a fetal stethoscope (1834).

Selected publications 
 De Microcephalia. Halle 1830. (Dissertation) 
 . Orphanotropheum, Halle 1830. (Habilitation) 
 . (Obstetrical exploration) Verlag der Buchhandlung des Waisenhauses, Halle 1833–1834, two volumes
 . Waisenhaus, Halle 1845. 
 . Waisenhaus, Halle 1850. 
 . (Pathology of the pelvis); Engelmann, Leipzig 1852. 
 . Engelmann, Leipzig 1855

References 
 This article is based on a translation of an equivalent article at the German Wikipedia, reference listed as: ADB:Hohl, Anton Friedrich at Allgemeine Deutsche Biographie.
 eMedicine Congenital Spinal Deformity

1789 births
1862 deaths
People from Bad Lobenstein
German obstetricians
Academic staff of the University of Halle